The Lacs d'Arrémoulit is a group of lakes in Pyrénées-Atlantiques, France.

Lakes of Pyrénées-Atlantiques